Stengle is a surname. Notable people with the surname include:

 Charles I. Stengle (1869–1953), American politician
 Tyson Stengle (born 1998), Australian rules footballer

See also
 Stengel